The East Coast boubou or Zanzibar boubou (Laniarius sublacteus) is a species of bird in the family Malaconotidae.
It is found from southeast Somalia to northeast Tanzania, and Zanzibar island.

Its natural habitat is moist savanna.

It has vestigial or no white wing stripe. Outer tail feathers may have white tips. Juveniles have no barring on underside. An all-black morph occurs in the area around the lower Jubba and Tana Rivers and on the Lamu Archipelago.

Recent cladistic analysis of nDNA BRM15 intron-15 and mtDNA NADH dehydrogenase subunit 2 and ATP synthase F0 subunit 6 sequence data indicates that the Ethiopian boubou is a polyphyletic cryptic species complex, which was once lumped with the tropical boubou, black boubou, and Ethiopian boubou.

References

East Coast boubou
Birds of East Africa
East Coast boubou